Next Top Model, Season 2 is the second season of Next Top Model. It premiered on October 11, 2010.

The host and the panel of the judges remains the same as the first season. Greek model Vicky Kaya (Greek: Βίκυ Καγιά) assumes the role of Tyra Banks from the original series as the head of the search as well as a mentor for the contestants. The panel consists of the former model Jenny Balatsinou, fashion designer Christoforos Kontentos and noted photographer Charis Christopoulos.

The final episode aired on February 21, 2011. The winner was 17-year-old Cindy Toli from Athens, Greece. Her prizes included an all-expenses paid trip to Milan and a contract with MP Management, a cover and spread with Madame Figaro magazine, an all-expenses paid trip to New York City and representation by Maybelline New York, a contract with BSB clothing line and a Chevrolet Spark.

The international destinations for this season were Paris, France and Istanbul, Turkey.

Cast

Contestants
(Ages stated are at start of contest)

Judges
Vicky Kaya
Jenny Balatsinou
Christoforos Kontentos
Charis Christopoulos

Other cast members
Tassos Sofroniou - photo shoot director

Episodes

Episode 1
First aired October 11, 2010

The next day after the Bootcamp, the 25 Models were photographed by Harry Christopoulos and Tassos Sofroniou in the streets of Mykonos.
After the shooting the girls returned to Athens and waited anxiously for the meeting with the judges who would decide which 20 girls will begin their attempt to become the Next Top Model.

Back in Athens, the 20 models had to pose for the photographer Takis Diamantopoulos on the brink of the 20th floor of the President Hotel. Agni and Evangelia revealed to Tassos that they are afraid of heights and therefore the photo shoot was even more difficult for them.
When the girls returned home they found their books with the best shots from the photo shoot. Maria’s book, however, was not there and so she left the house.

Eliminated outside of judging panel: Maria Markarian
Featured photographers: Charis Christopoulos, Tassos Sofroniou, Takis Diamantopoulos

Episode 2
First aired October 18, 2010

In this week’s photo shoot the girls had to pose in pairs of two in front of a damaged car. The concept was that the girls were fighting with each other about whose fault it was that they were stuck in the middle of nowhere. The girls at the beginning were reluctant to raise tons. Vicky took action impressed everybody with how convincingly she shouted and allegedly started fighting with them to show them how to play the role. The girls though were only 19, so one of them did not have a pair for the photo shoot. Vicky announced to everybody that Ioanna’s pair would be Monika, the runner up of the first Next Top Model.

Best photo: Elena Papadopoulou & Evangelia Koutalidou
Bottom two: Elektra Tsela & Kelly Vourtsi
Eliminated: Elektra Tsela
Featured photographer: Thanassis Krikis

Episode 3
First aired November 1, 2010

For this week's photo shoot the girls went to the zoo and had to pose with different animals like snakes or an eagle. The first one to react of course was Nancy. After a melt-down and almost a faint, she convinced Tassos to change her partner, so she posed with an eagle and had only 5 shots. Even though Nancy did horribly, Roubini was eliminated.

Best photo: Jessica Anthi
Bottom two: Nancy Papastavrou & Roubini Agapitou
Eliminated: Roubini Agapitou
Featured photographer: Thodoris Psiachos

Episode 4
First aired November 8, 2010

For this week’s photo shoot the girls had to pose in swimsuits and into the arms of Greek actor Dimitris Vlachos. And while everyone thought that it would be more difficult for Nancy to do the photo shoot, Georgia struggled perhaps more on the set with Dimitris Vlachos, since he is her favorite actor. All the girls felt a little uncomfortable in the beginning but Vicky stimulated them by posing herself with Dimitris to show them how to do it right.

Best photo: Cindorella 'Cindy' Toli
Bottom three: Agni Panagiotatou, Fenia Dimopoulou & Laura-Ann Markopoulioti
Eliminated: Agni Panagiotatou
Featured photographer: Giorgos Lekakis

Episode 5
First aired November 15, 2010

For this week’s photo shoot the models had a difficult task. They had to be photographed naked using only balloons to cover parts of their bodies. Naturally the first to react negatively to the concept was Nancy. However, it was not only Nancy who didn’t feel good for this photo shoot. Almost all the girls were hesitant in the beginning. Georgia was uncomfortable in the beginning but once she was on the set she loosened up and had more fun than any of the other girls.

Quit: Kelly Vourtsi
Best photo: Ioanna Papagianni
Quit: Aliki Karpodini
Bottom three: Emily Nicolaidou, Laura-Ann Markopoulioti & Marina Klitsa
Eliminated: Marina Klitsa
Featured photographer: Tassos Sofroniou

Episode 6
First aired November 22, 2010

The girls had to pose with different animals like a spider, worms or even a small crocodile as part of a perfume ad. Emily had her last chance to prove herself to the judges. It was a big shock when Nancy didn't  react at all and took everything in.

Best photo: Emily Nicolaidou
Bottom two: Jian Nan Peng & Laura-Ann Markopoulioti
Eliminated: Laura-Ann Markopoulioti
Featured photographer: Pantelis Zervos

Episode 7
First aired November 29, 2010

For this week's photo shoot the  girls had to act like they were young again and try to imitate one of their baby photos (that their parents had given in but the girls didn't know that at that time). During the photo shoot their parents showed and gave courage to the girls to continue trying. Elena was emotionally overwhelmed so it distracted her from doing well. At the judging panel the judges tested their runway skills but the girls didn't do so well. The one to be eliminated was Fenia as her photo was horrible and her runway walk was even worse.

 Best photo: Jessica Anthi
 Bottom two: Fenia Dimopoulou & Ioanna Papagianni
 Eliminated: Fenia Dimopoulou
Featured photographer: Iwanna Tzetzoymi

Episode 8
First aired December 6, 2010

For this week's photo shoot the girls were taken to a car cemetery. The girls had to pose with the cars and act like they were angry and mad at everyone. At the judging panel the one that was eliminated was Emily as her photo was not worthy and her runway walk was not good.

Best photo: Cindorella 'Cindy' Toli
Bottom two: Emily Nicolaidou & Jian Nan Peng
Eliminated: Emily Nicolaidou
Featured photographer: Charlie Makos

Episode 9
First aired December 13, 2010

The models need to embody some of the popular Hollywood Icons

Best photo: Ioanna Papagianni
Bottom two: Elena Papadopoulou & Stefania Papagianni
Eliminated: Stefania Papagianni
Featured photographer: James KalaΪtakis

Episode 10
First aired December 20, 2010

For this week, the girls did a photo-shoot while being coated with candy.

Best photo: Georgia Antoniou
Bottom two: Cindorella 'Cindy' Toli & Jian Nan Peng
Eliminated: Jian Nan Peng
Featured photographer: Thomas Chrisochoidis

Episode 11
First aired December 27, 2010

This is the recap episode.

Episode 12
First aired January 10, 2011

For this week, the theme of the photo shoot was Underground Club Rockers, where the girls posed as them and also with other male models/their fellow competitors.

Best photo: Nancy Papastavrou
Bottom two: Cindorella 'Cindy' Toli & Irene Aligizaki
Eliminated: Irene Aligizaki
Featured photographer: Konstantinos Rigos

Episode 13
First aired January 17, 2011

Best photo: Cindorella 'Cindy' Toli
Bottom two: Elena Papadopoulou & Nancy Papastavrou
Eliminated: Nancy Papastavrou

Episode 14
First aired January 24, 2011

Best photo: Cindorella 'Cindy' Toli
Bottom two: Elena Papadopoulou & Evangelia Koutalidou
Eliminated: None

Episode 15
First aired January 31, 2011

Best photo: Ioanna Papagianni
Bottom two: Georgia Antoniou & Jessica Anthi
Eliminated: Georgia Antoniou

Episode 16
First aired February 7, 2011
Best photo: Elena Papadopoulou
Bottom two: Evangelia Koutalidou & Jessica Anthi
Quit: Jessica Anthi

Episode 17First aired February 14, 2011
Eliminated: None

Episode 18
First aired February 21, 2011

In the final week, the girls traveled to Istanbul to do some castings and a photo shoot. After the girls arrived, they headed to explore the city. Later, they met Tasos with a famous Turkish TV presenter and producer, Acun Ilıcalı. One of the girls would have the opportunity to be the co-host in his show. They were interviewed by Acun and also the managers of the channel Show TV. The winner was Elena. After this the girls went shopping in the market of Istanbul. The next day they met again Tasos and informed them that Cindy and Ioanna would have a casting in Turkish Marie Claire for an editorial they are doing, in which Cindy won. Elena and Evangelia would have had a casting for a famous Turkish designer, but it was cancelled. Before their photo shoot, the girls went to the hotel's spa to relax. At their photo shoot they met Vicky, and they posed as fairies inspired by One Thousand and One Nights. The next day the girls returned from Istanbul. Later they met Vicky and had a challenge, in which they had to present a product of NIVEA. The winner was Elena and won NIVEA products for one year. The other day, they went to their final photo shoot inspired by Annie Leibovitz Fairy tale and posed as Couture Women along with two children. Later, they were invited to dinner by Vicky where she advised and guided the girls for the last time before their final performance. The girls arrived where the fashion show for Christoforos Kontentos would take place. All of the girls impressed with their walk, even though Ioanna's heel broke and Cindy's belt came off during the runway.

At the final judging, all of the girls were praised for their performance at the photo shoots and runway show. After the first deliberation, two girls would be eliminated immediately. The first girl to be eliminated, despite her stunning photos, was Ioanna because of her lack of height and her not so strong performance in the runway show. The second girl to be eliminated, despite her very strong performance in the runway show, was Elena because of her lack of confidence and inability to transceive her personality into her photos, as well as her average performance in the entire competition.

Eliminated: Elena Papadopoulou & Ioanna Papagianni

As a result, Cindy and Evangelia made to the final two leading to two emotional eliminations. Cindy was praised for her photo shoots and runway show and was told that even though she was young she had a very strong performance in the entire competition. However, she was criticized for being too posey which didn't let her show her real age and mood. Evangelia was praised for her photo shoots, runway show, strong eyes and good personality. However, the judges were worried that she would have a limited number of job offers and some people will love her and others will reject her. During the final deliberation, the judges were divided over their preference of the girls. After a long wait, the girls were called back and Vicky announced Cindy as the second winner of The Next Top Model.

Final two: Cindorella 'Cindy' Toli & Evangelia Koutalidou
Greece's Next Top Model: Cindorella 'Cindy' Toli
Featured photographer: Giannis Bournias, Dimitris Skoulos
Guest judge: Andrea Losavio (booking director of MP Management)

Results

 
 The contestant was eliminated outside of judging panel
 The contestant was part of a collective call-out with another contestant
 The contestant was eliminated
 The contestant quit the competition
 The contestant was part of a non-elimination bottom two
 The contestant won the competition

Bottom two

 The contestant was eliminated after her first time in the bottom two
 The contestant was eliminated after her second time in the bottom two
 The contestant was eliminated after her third time in the bottom two
 The contestant was eliminated outside of judging panel
 The contestant was eliminated in the final judging and placed fourth
 The contestant was eliminated in the final judging and placed third
 The contestant was eliminated in the final judging and placed as the runner-up

Average  call-out order
Episode 1 & Episode 18 are not included.

Photo shoots

Episode 1 photo shoots: Mykonos island; posing with gowns on a rooftop
Episode 2 photo shoot: Broken cadillac in pairs
Episode 3 photo shoot: Pin-up girls posing with animals
Episode 4 photo shoot: Posing with a male model on the beach
Episode 5 photo shoot: Posing nude with silver balloons
Episode 6 photo shoot: Perfume ad with lizards, scorpions, and tarantulas
Episode 7 photo shoot: Re-enacting baby photos
Episode 8 photo shoot: B&W in a junk yard
Episode 9 photo shoot: Hollywood icon impersonations
Episode 10 photo shoot: Coated in candy
Episode 12 photo shoot: Studio 54
Episode 13 photo shoot: Iconic fashion women
Episode 14 photo shoot: Posing inside a cube
Episode 15 photo shoot: Tuileries Garden wearing Jean Paul Gaultier designs
Episode 16 photo shoots: Runway shots; eyes above water; walking down Athens
Episode 17 photo shoots: B&W crying beauty shots; jumping with a male model; high fashion aliens in nature
Episode 18 photo shoots: One Thousand and One Nights; Annie Leibovitz fairy tale inspired shoot

References

External links
 Official website

Greece
2010 Greek television seasons
2011 Greek television seasons